Park Eun-hui (born 1 June 1970) is a South Korean fencer. She competed in the women's individual and team foil events at the 1988 Summer Olympics.

References

External links
 

1970 births
Living people
South Korean female foil fencers
Olympic fencers of South Korea
Fencers at the 1988 Summer Olympics